The Meteor class was a pair of two avisos built for the German Kaiserliche Marine (Imperial Navy) in the late-1880s and early 1890s. Unlike earlier avisos built for the fleet, which were designed to fill a variety of roles, the Meteor class was intended to protect the fleet's capital ships from torpedo boat attacks. They were armed with a battery of four  quick-firing guns. Both vessels suffered from serious problems that rendered them unfit for service, namely poor seakeeping and excessive vibration of their propeller shafts. As a result, they saw little service, with Comets only periods in commission being to test what were unsuccessful attempts to correct the problems. Meteor had a somewhat more active career, serving with the fleet in 1893–1894 and then as a fishery protection ship in 1895–1896, but she, too, spent most of her existence laid up. Both vessels were decommissioned in 1896 and struck from the naval register in 1911. Meteor was then used as a barracks ship, while Comet became a storage hulk; the two ships were broken up in 1919 and 1921, respectively.

Design
The Imperial Navy began building small avisos in the 1880s to serve in the main fleet in German waters. These vessels were intended to support the battle line, as scouts for the fleet, as flotilla leaders for the fleet's torpedo boats, and as a screen against enemy torpedo boats. Unlike the contemporary German unprotected cruisers, their designs emphasized offensive capability and high speed rather than a long cruising radius. In 1888, the German naval command decided that future avisos should be focused solely on defense against hostile torpedo boats. Compared to the earlier s, the Meteor design was slightly smaller and displaced around 25 percent less than the earlier vessels. The primary alterations included a more powerful propulsion system, a new gun armament of quick-firing guns, and slightly thicker armor plating.

Meteor and Comet proved to be failures in service. They suffered from severe vibration and their small size rendered them poor sea boats; these defects significantly curtailed their careers, and they spent most of their existence in reserve.

General characteristics and machinery

Their hulls were constructed from transverse steel frames. Meteor was initially fitted with a single pole mainmast, while Comet had the pole mainmast along with a smaller mast further aft for wireless telegraphy. In 1901–1902, Meteor was fitted with the second mast as well.

The Meteor-class ships had a crew of 7 officers and 108 enlisted men. The ships carried several smaller boats, including one yawl, one dinghy, and one cutter. They were poor sea boats; they were very unstable in anything but calm weather. They also vibrated excessively due to severe cavitation, particularly at high speeds. Both ships were, however, very maneuverable vessels.

Steam for the engines was provided by four coal-fired locomotive boilers that were trunked into two funnels on the centerline. Steering was controlled by a single rudder.

The ships' propulsion system varied slightly in performance.

Armament and armor

The ships were armed with four  SK L/30 guns placed in single pivot mounts, two side-by-side forward, and two side-by-side aft. They also carried three  torpedo tubes, one mounted submerged in the bow and the other two in deck-mounted launchers on the broadside. They were supplied with eight torpedoes. Both ships were protected with steel armor.

Ships

Service history

After Meteor entered service, the problems with her design became apparent; attempts to remedy the defects and sea trials to determine the efforts' effectiveness occupied much of the ship's first two years in service. This period also saw the ship take part in training exercises with the rest of the German fleet. By 1893, Comet had also entered service, and she also underwent ultimately ineffective modifications following her initial trials. Meteor was employed as a fisheries protection vessel in 1895–1896, though she proved unsuited to the task, owing to her small size, which limited the amount of coal she could store and thus the amount of time she could remain on patrol in Germany's coastal waters. As a result, she was withdrawn from that service in late 1896.

Comet never saw an extended period of active service; her only periods in commission were to conduct trials after alterations were made to the ship. She, too, was laid up in 1896; both ships were reclassified as light cruisers in 1899 and then reduced to harbor guard ships in 1904. Both were struck from the naval register in 1911, with Meteor becoming a barracks ship in Kiel and Comet being converted into a storage hulk for naval mines. Meteor and Comet were sold for scrapping in 1919 and 1921, respectively.

Notes

References